Philippe Dubourg (9 July 1938 – 11 April 2021) was a French politician. He served as Mayor of Illats from 1977 to 2021 and represented Gironde's 9th constituency in the National Assembly from 1993 to 1997 and again from 2002 to 2007.

References

1938 births
2021 deaths
20th-century French politicians
21st-century French politicians
Deputies of the 10th National Assembly of the French Fifth Republic
Deputies of the 12th National Assembly of the French Fifth Republic
Mayors of places in Nouvelle-Aquitaine
Rally for the Republic politicians
Union for a Popular Movement politicians
The Republicans (France) politicians
Politicians from Bordeaux
French dentists